{{DISPLAYTITLE:Prostaglandin DP1 receptor}}

The Prostaglandin D2 receptor 1 (DP1), a G protein-coupled receptor encoded by the PTGDR1 gene (also termed PTGDR), is primarily a receptor for prostaglandin D2 (PGD2). The receptor is a member of the Prostaglandin receptors belonging to the Subfamily A14 of rhodopsin-like receptors. Activation of DP1 by PGD2 or other cognate receptor ligands is associated with a variety of physiological and pathological responses in animal models.

Gene 
The PTGDR1 gene is located on chromosome 14 at position q22.1, (i.e. 14q22.1), a chromosomal locus associated with asthma and other allergic disorders. PTGDR1, which consists of 4 introns and 5 exons, encodes for a ~44 kilodalton protein but also multiple alternative spliced transcript variants (https://www.ncbi.nlm.nih.gov/gene/5729).

Expression 
DP1 is expressed primarily by cells involved in mediating allergic and inflammatory reactions, i.e. human and rodent mast cells, basophils, and eosinophils, Th2 cells, and dendritic cells, and by cells contributing to these reactions, i.e. human and/or rodent airway epithelial cells, vascular endothelium, mucus-secreting goblet cells in the nasal and colonic mucosa, and serous gland cells of the nose. DP1 protein is expressed in mouse placenta and testes and mRNA transcripts have also been detected in the meninges of the mouse brain by multiple reports and, by single reports, in the rat meninges as well as the mouse thalamus, hippocampus, cerebellum, brainstem, and retina.

Ligands

Activating ligands
PGD2 binds to and activates DP1 at concentrations in the 0.5 to 1 nanomolar range.  Relative potencies in binding to and activating DP1 for the following prostanoids are: PGD2>>PGE2>Prostaglandin F2alpha>PGI2=thromboxane A2, with PGD2 being more than 100-fold more potent than PGE2 in binding to and stimulating DP1.  (http://www.guidetopharmacology.org/GRAC/ObjectDisplayForward?objectId=338). PDJ2, Δ12-PDJ2, and 15-deoxy-Δ12,14-PGJ2, which form in vitro and in vivo rapidly as non-enzymatic rearrangements of PGD2 (see Cyclopentenone prostaglandins), also bind to and activate DP1, with PDJ2 doing so almost as effectively as PDG2 and the latter two PGJs doing so 100-fold and 300-fold less potently than PDG2.  Other compounds, e.g. L-644,698, BW 245C, BW A868C, and ZK 110841, have been synthesized, found to be about as potent as PGD2 in binding to and stimulating DP1, and used to study the function of this receptor.
The drug Treprostinil is a high affinity ligand for and potent activator of not only DP1 but also two other prostanoid receptors, EP2 and IP.

Inhibiting ligands
Asapiprant (S-555739) and  Laropiprant are selective receptor antagonists of DP1 whereas Vidupiprant is a receptor antagonist for both DP1 and DP2.

Mechanisms of cell activation
Among the 8 human prostanoid receptors, DP1, along with IP, EP2, and EP4, are classified as relaxant prostanoid receptors; each, including DP1, is a G protein-coupled receptors that works by activating G-S proteins which in turn raises cellular cAMP levels thereby mobilizing Cyclic adenosine monophosphate-activated cell signaling pathways which regulate cell function. DP1 activation also causes the mobilization of calcium in HEK293 cells transfected with this receptor. It does so by a mechanism that is independent of Inositol trisphosphate signaling; Ligand-activated DP1 also mobilizes G protein-coupled receptor kinase 2 (GRK2, also known as β-Adrenergic receptor kinase 2 [BARK1]) and arrestin 2 (also known as Arrestin beta 1 [ARRB1]). These agents act to uncouple DP1 from its G proteins and to internalize in a process that limits the DP1's cell-activation life-time in a process termed homologous desensitization. Activation of protein kinase Cs likewise trigger DP1 to uncouple from G proteins and internalize although in model studies DP1 has not been shown to cause the activation of PKC (see Protein kinase C#Function).

Activities

Allergy

Tissue studies
Studies in mouse as well as human tissues and cells find that DP1 stimulation has numerous pro-allergic effects. DP1 activation blocks the production of interleukin 12 by dendritic cells; this biases the development of naïve T lymphocytes to Th-2 rather than Th-1 helper cells and thereby promotes allergic rather than non-allergic inflammatory responses (see T helper cell#Th1/Th2 Model for helper T cells and T helper cell#Limitations to the Th1/Th2 model. DH1 activation also promotes allergic reactions by suppressing the function of natural killer cells, prolonging the survival of eosinophils, and stimulation the maturation of dermal mast cell.

Animal studies
Studies of experimentally-induced allergic responses in animals further implicate DP1 in allergy. DP1 gene knockout and/or DP1 inhibition by receptor antagonists markedly reduces airway inflammation, obstruction, hypersensitivity, and pro-allergic cytokine and chemokine production in a mouse model of ovalbumin-induced asthma as well as allergic symptoms in a guinea pig model of allergic conjunctivitis, rhinitis, and asthma. The administration of PGD2 into the skin of rats or into the eyes of rabbits causes local symptoms of allery. These responses are thought, but not yet proved, to be mediated by DP1 activation. In contrast to these results, however, activation of DP1 by intratrachael administration of a selective DP1 activator activated DP1 on dendritic cells to suppress airway allergic inflammation by increasing the number of Foxp3+ CD4+ regulatory T cells. Furthermore, DP1 activation reduces eosinophilia in allergic inflammation and blocks antigen-presenting langerhans cell function in mice. This results suggest that DP1 can promote or suppress allergic responses depending on the animal model tested and, perhaps, the type of allergic reaction investigated.

Human studies
Allergen inhalation challenge of humans produces rises in the PGD2 levels in their Bronchoalveolar lavage fluids. Furthermore, the administration of PGD2 into the nose or skin of human volunteers produces local symptoms of allergy and the inhalation of PGD2 into asthmatics causes constriction of the airways as well as the potentiation of airway constriction responses. These reactions, similar to those produced in animal studies, may be mediated by DP1.

Central nervous system
PGD2 is the most abundant prostanoid in the brains of humans and other mammals and DP1 receptors are located on Arachnoid mater trabecular cells in mouse basal forebrain. The PGD2-DP1 pathway is involved in the regulation of non-rapid eye movement sleep in rodents: infusion of PGD2 into the lateral ventricle of mice or the brain of rats induces an increase in the amount of non-rapid eye movement sleep in wild-type (WT) but not DP1-deficient animals. This sleep-induction appears to involve the DP1-dependent stimulation of adenosine formation and subsequent simulation of the Adenosine A2A receptor by adenosine.  In humans, a genetic variant of ADA associated with the reduced metabolism of adenosine to inosine has been reported to deep sleep and SWA during sleep. These studies suggest that DP1 has a similar role in the sleep of humans.

Pulmonary hypertension
Pulmonary arterial hypertension, Who group 1 (see Pulmonary hypertension#Causes), in humans in commonly treated with specific pulmonary artery vasodilators that increase survival such as the prostacyclin I2 (PGI2) mimetics including Treprostinil, epoprostanol, Iloprost, and beraprost. Recent studies find that DP1 as well as the PGI2 receptor protein are expressed in human pulmonary arteries and veins; that treprostinil but not iloprost caused pulmonary vein relaxation in part by acting through DP1 in insolated human pulmonary vascular preparations; and that the effect of treprostinil on DP1 in human pulmonary veins may contribute to its therapeutic efficacy in primary pulmonary hypertension.

Reproduction
Studies in male mice indicate that DP1 activation induces the translocation of SOX9 into the nucleus thereby signaling for the maturation of Sertoli cells and embryonic gonads. Disruption of this DP1-activated circuit leads to disordered maturation of the male reproductive organs such as Cryptorchidism (i.e. failure of testes descent into the scrotum) in mice and, it is suggested, may also do so in humans.

Genomics studies
Human Genomics studies have associated Single-nucleotide polymorphism variants with an increased incidence of allergic diseases. Studies in two different populations have replicated associations between -549T>C, -441C>T, and -197T>C variants and a study in a single population has associated the -613C>T variation with increased incidences of nasal polyposis, asthma, and/or aspirin sensitivity; the -197T>C and -613 C>T variants were also associated with increased incidences of allergic reactions to pollen and mites. A single population study associated the -731A>C variant and studies in two different population associated the 6651C>T variant with increased incidences of asthma and/or bronchial hyper-reactivity. The intrinsic variants rs17831675, rs17831682, and rs58004654 (now termed rs7709505) have been associated with an increased incidence of asthma in single population studies.  A metaanalasis −549 C/T, −441 C/T, and −197 C/T found that of these three variants, only −549 C/T conferred susceptibility to asthma in Europeans and that this susceptibility was limited to adults.

See also
 Prostaglandin receptors
 Prostanoid receptors
 Prostaglandin DP2 receptor
 Eicosanoid receptor

References

Further reading

External links

G protein-coupled receptors